The Hellenic Motor Museum (Greek: Ελληνικό Μουσείο Αυτοκινήτου) is a car museum in Athens. The museum is situated in central Athens near the National Archaeological Museum, on the three top floors of the Athenian Capitol shopping mall.

The collection of the museum consists of 300 cars of which about 110 are displayed periodically. The museum offers many other facilities such as a Formula 1 simulator, a road safety educational programme and an amphitheatre.

See also 
 List of museums in Greece

External links
 Official website.

Museums in Athens
Automobile museums in Greece